Blore with Swinscoe is a civil parish north-west of Ashbourne, in the Staffordshire Moorlands district of Staffordshire, England, on the edge of the Peak District National Park.  According to the 2001 census, it had a population of 123, apparently declining to less than 100 according to the 2011 census. The parish includes Blore and Swinscoe.

See also
Listed buildings in Blore with Swinscoe

External links

Villages in Staffordshire
Staffordshire Moorlands